Sister Zeph, birth name Riffat Arif, is a Pakistani teacher, women’s activist and philanthropist from Gujranwala, Pakistan.

Early life
She was a leader at school and had plans of becoming a lawyer. When she was thirteen her first article on Women’s Rights appeared in Pakistan’s leading newspaper the Daily Jang. She left school when in grade seven and taught herself at home, finally passing the tenth grade Board examination. It was around this time that she started teaching other girls. She distributed flyers among her neighbours announcing free education for girls.

The girls initially studied in rented, open roof houses with Sister Zeph’s financial support. Using self study she completed a master's degree in Political science in 2010, and a master's degree History in 2013. By 2016, her organization had taught over 500 girls and empowered 100 more.

Documentary
Her story has now been made into a documentary of her life and that of three of her students in their struggle against child marriage, corporal punishment and societal pressures, towards empowering girls and young women through education.

The film won the Gold Medal in the Best Documentary: Community Portraits category at the New York Festivals 2016. The documentary called Flight of the Falcons has made it to the finals of the 2015 Asia-Pacific Child Rights Award for Television.

Award
She won the Lynn Syms Prize in 2014, which honours her as a grassroots leader.
The award enabled Sister Zeph to expand her school and include more girls. She expanded the infrastructure to accommodate 200 girl students, and has hired more teachers. Her program now offers such diverse classes as computers, beautician, and martial arts for girls.

References

Living people
Pakistani Christians
Pakistani educators
Pakistani women
Date of birth missing (living people)
Place of birth missing (living people)
People from Gujranwala
Punjabi women
Year of birth missing (living people)